A Day in the Life of Ranger Smith is a stand-alone animated television special, and a parody of a Hanna-Barbera cartoon series, The Yogi Bear Show, which revolves around Ranger Smith. A Day in the Life of Ranger Smith was made by The Ren & Stimpy Show creator John Kricfalusi and his company Spümcø.  A Day in the Life of Ranger Smith originally aired on Cartoon Network on September 24, 1999, along with Boo Boo Runs Wild, a similar Yogi Bear-themed stand alone special.

Since its original debut in 1999, A Day in the Life of Ranger Smith has aired on Cartoon Network's late night programming block, Adult Swim. The special was jokingly dedicated to William Hanna and Joseph Barbera, despite the two of them still being alive at that time.

This marked the last Yogi Bear production in which Greg Burson voiced Yogi. Stephen Worth replaced Burson for Boo Boo Runs Wild and Burson never voiced the character again; he was arrested in 2004 (effectively ending his career) and died in 2008.

Voice cast
Corey Burton– Ranger John Smith
Greg Burson– Yogi Bear, Squirrel Girl
John Kricfalusi– Boo-Boo Bear, Squirrel Boy
Kevin Kolde– Squirrel
Mary Ellen Thomas– Squirrel Baby

Plot
Ranger Smith awakes to a depressing morning where he declares his hate of the job. He then walks outside and wakes the sun by kicking on a mountain in the foreground. Then he proceeds to walk through the forest, changing appearances every time he passes a tree. His mood improves as he walks through the forest. He then finds a squirrel holding acorns and demands to see a license for them. When the squirrel doesn't produce one, Ranger Smith confiscates the nuts. The squirrel's children then poke their heads from the door. Ranger Smith notices this and demands to see a marriage license. When the squirrel can't produce one Ranger Smith decides to write a ticket but to "let him off easy" this time. He demands that the squirrel store pickles for the winter and may only keep one child. The scene then changes to Yogi Bear and Boo Boo Bear's cave. The two bears are showering while Ranger Smith watches them, taking notes. The scene suddenly changes to night with Ranger Smith on his hands and knees holding a flash light to his face. He then says that it is "Owl Feeding Time" and that what he has to do is not for civilian eyes. The screen cuts to black and strange sound effects are played. When the scene cuts back Ranger Smith is now standing; he looks as if he were beaten. He then proceeds to go back to his cabin. He gets back in bed once again complaining about his job and life.

See also
 Boo Boo Runs Wild
 Ranger Smith
 Spümcø

References

External links
 
 

1999 television specials
1990s American television specials
1990s animated television specials
American parody films
Yogi Bear television specials
Spümcø
1990s American animated films